Anabelle Rodríguez Rodríguez (born December 24, 1950) is a Puerto Rican lawyer, former state Attorney General, and former Associate Justice of the Supreme Court of Puerto Rico. In December 2020 she reached the age of 70, at which point the Puerto Rico Constitution mandated her retirement from the Supreme Court of Puerto Rico.

Early life and education
Rodríguez was born in 1950 in Santurce, Puerto Rico, and obtained a bachelor's degree in History, magna cum laude, from the University of Puerto Rico at Rio Piedras. In 1985, she obtained a juris doctor magna cum laude, from the same university. She has two sons: Fernando Vela, a web developer based in Gainesville, Florida, and Ricardo Vela, a history teacher in White Plains, New York.

Career
Rodriguez held various positions in the Puerto Rican private and government sector. She began her career in law as Law Clerk to Superior Court Judge Angel G. Hermida.

In 1997, she was nominated by Bill Clinton to be U.S. District Court Judge for the District of Puerto Rico, but her nomination was rejected by the Senate Judiciary Committee three times.

In 2001, she was appointed Secretary of Justice of Puerto Rico by Governor Sila Calderón. She worked to extend domestic violence protections to homosexual couples on the island.

In 2004, Calderon appointed Rodriguez to the Supreme Court. She officially took office on August 19, 2004, becoming the third woman ever to serve in the Supreme Court of Puerto Rico. In February 2016, she was acting Chief Justice of the Court prior to the swearing in of Maite Oronoz Rodríguez.

References

External links
Rodriguez biography at the Supreme Court of Puerto Rico website - in Spanish.

|-

1950 births
Associate Justices of the Supreme Court of Puerto Rico
Living people
Secretaries of Justice of Puerto Rico
University of Puerto Rico alumni
People from Santurce, Puerto Rico
Puerto Rican judges